Daddy's Gone A-Hunting may refer to:
 Daddy's Gone A-Hunting (1925 film), an American silent drama film
 Daddy's Gone A-Hunting (1969 film), an American thriller film